Matthias Habich (born 12 January 1940) is a German actor who has appeared in more than 110 film and television productions since 1965. Habich was born in Danzig (present-day Gdańsk, Poland) and lives in Paris. In the 2001 film Enemy at the Gates about Stalingrad, he played the part of General (later Field Marshal) Friedrich Paulus. In the 2004 film Downfall, he portrayed Werner Haase.

Films (selection) 

 1973: Die merkwürdige Lebensgeschichte des Friedrich Freiherrn von der Trenck (TV miniseries, directed by Fritz Umgelter) – Friedrich von der Trenck
 1973: Abenteuer eines Sommers (directed by Helmut Pfandler) – Michelitsch
 1974:  (TV film, directed by Fritz Umgelter) – Miroslav als Erwachsener
 1975:  (TV miniseries, directed by Fritz Umgelter) – Orlov
 1975:  (TV miniseries, directed by Fritz Umgelter) – Simplex
 1976: Fluchtgefahr (TV film, directed by Markus Imhoof) – Winarski
 1976: Coup de Grâce (directed by Volker Schlöndorff) – Erich von Lhomond
 1977:  (directed by Bernhard Sinkel and Alf Brustellin) – Jan Amery
 1977:  (directed by Jean-Claude Tramont) – Bruno
 1978:  (directed by Bernhard Sinkel) – Leonard
 1978:  (TV film, directed by Egon Günther) – Zwingli
 1980:  (directed by Robert van Ackeren)
 1982: Imperative (directed by Krzysztof Zanussi) – Theologist
 1982: Jack Holborn (TV miniseries, directed by Sigi Rothemund) – Kapitän & Richter / Captain & Lord Sharingham
 1983: Embers (directed by Thomas Koerfer)
 1984: Les Morfalous (directed by Henri Verneuil) – Karl
 1987: Pink Palace, Paradise Beach (directed by Milan Dor) – Daniel
 1987: The Cry of the Owl (TV film, directed by ) – Robert
 1988: The Passenger – Welcome to Germany (directed by Thomas Brasch) – Körner
 1988: Straight for the Heart (directed by Léa Pool) – Pierre Kurwenal
 1988: Crash (TV film, directed by Tom Toelle) – Richard Jansen
 1988:  (directed by Jacques Rouffio) – Schulze-Bousen
 1989: Noch ein Wunsch (TV film, directed by Thomas Koerfer) – Martin
 1990: Farendj (directed by Sabine Prenczina) – Bruno
 1990:  (TV film, directed by Ludvík Ráža) – Magnus
 1991:  (directed by Rainer Simon) – Hauptmann / Teiresias
 1991: The Savage Woman (La Demoiselle sauvage) (directed by Léa Pool) – Élysée
 1992:  (TV film, directed by ) – Franz
 1992: Extralarge (TV series, episode: "Cannonball", directed by Enzo G. Castellari) – Dr. Shuby
 1993: The Last U-Boat (TV film, directed by Frank Beyer) – Mellenberg – General
 1994: Lauras Entscheidung (TV film, directed by Uwe Janson) – Joachim Böllinger
 1995: Deutschlandlied (TV miniseries, directed by Tom Toelle) – Konrad Schuhbeck
 1995:  (directed by Jean-Pierre Mocky) – Chris Corday
 1995: Das zehnte Jahr (directed by Käthe Kratz) – Max
 1996: Slaughter of the Cock (directed by Andreas Pantzis)
 1996: Tatort:  (TV, directed by Nina Grosse) – Prof. Otto Sorensky
 1996: Beyond Silence (directed by Caroline Link) – Gregor (Clarissa's husband)
 1997:  (directed by Andreas Kleinert) – Kommissar Norbert Michaelis
 1997: The Rat (TV film, directed by ) – Markus Frank
 1997:  (TV film, directed by Oliver Hirschbiegel) – Der Fremde
 1998: Sugar for the Beast (TV film, directed by ) – Dr. Kaltenbach
 1999: Picknick im Schnee (TV film, directed by ) – Johannes Breutigam
 2000:  (TV miniseries, directed by Margarethe von Trotta) – Heinrich Cressphal
 2001: Boran (directed by ) – Boran
 2001: Enemy at the Gates (directed by Jean-Jacques Annaud) – General Paulus
 2001: Nowhere in Africa (directed by Caroline Link) – Walter Süßkind
 2003:  (TV film, directed by Gernot Roll) – General von Habich
 2003: Raus ins Leben (directed by Vivian Naefe) – Michael Berkhoff
 2004: Nero (TV film, directed by Paul Marcus) – Seneca
 2004: Downfall (directed by Oliver Hirschbiegel) – Prof. Werner Haase
 2005: Waves (TV film, directed by Vivian Naefe) – Rolf von Buttlär
 2005:  (TV film, directed by Roland Suso Richter) – Richard – Catherine's Father
 2005: Küss mich, Hexe! (TV film, directed by Diethard Küster) – Der Herr der Finsternis
 2005: The Call of the Toad (directed by Robert Gliński) – Alexander Reschke
 2006:  (TV film, directed by ) – Ben
 2007: Afrika, mon amour (TV miniseries, directed by )
 2007: Caótica Ana (directed by Julio Medem) – Klaus
 2008: The Reader (directed by Stephen Daldry) – Peter Berg
 2009: Tatort:  (TV, directed by ) – Roland Plauer
 2009:  (TV film, directed by ) – Peter Grabowski
 2009: Der Großvater (Short, directed by )
 2009:  (directed by ) – Alain Laroche
 2010: Nanga Parbat (directed by Joseph Vilsmaier) – Pfarrer
 2010: Barriere (directed by Andreas Kleinert) – Hans Meinhold
 2010: Letzter Moment (TV film, directed by Sathyan Ramesh) – Peter Romberg
 2010: Die Schwester (TV film, directed by Margarethe von Trotta) – Gregor Antonion
 2010:  (TV film, directed by ) – Peter
 2011: Bloch: Der Heiland (TV, directed by ) – Martin Weidner
 2011:  (TV film, directed by ) – Harry Berg
 2012:  (TV film, directed by ) – Utz von Zernikow
 2012:  (TV film, directed by Dror Zahavi) – Paul
 2012: Liebe am Fjord – Abschied von Hannah (TV film, directed by ) – Henrik Agdestein
 2013:  (directed by Vivian Naefe) – Carsten Lexow
 2014: Die Toten von Hameln (TV film, directed by Christian von Castelberg) – Dr. Georg Bischoff
 2014:  (TV film, directed by Jan Georg Schütte) – Helge Löns
 2014: Where I Belong (directed by Fritz Urschitz) – Friedrich
 2015:  (directed by Margarethe von Trotta) – Paul Kromberger
 2015:  (TV film, directed by ) – Holm Hardenberg
 2017: Berlin Syndrome (directed by Cate Shortland) – Erich

References

External links 
 
 

1940 births
Living people
German male film actors
German male television actors
20th-century German male actors
21st-century German male actors
Male actors from Gdańsk
People from West Prussia